Nhoabe millotalis is a species of snout moth in the genus Nhoabe. It was described by Viette in 1953, and is known from Madagascar.

References

Moths described in 1953
Pyralinae
Moths of Madagascar
Moths of Africa